The USS Piscataqua, a screw steamer, was launched 11 June 1866 by Portsmouth Navy Yard; and commissioned 21 October 1867 with Captain Daniel Ammen in command.

On 16 December 1867, she sailed for the East Indies via the Cape of Good Hope, arriving Singapore 18 April 1868. Serving as flagship for the Asiatic Station, she visited ports in China, Japan, and the Philippines. From 1868 to 1869, a civil war raged in Japan; during the course of this war, Piscataqua protected the lives of United States citizens and American interests.

On 15 May 1869, her name was changed to Delaware, and on 23 August 1870, she departed Singapore for the United States. She arrived New York 19 November. Decommissioned 5 December 1870, she remained in the New York Navy Yard until sinking in 1876. She was sold for scrapping in February 1877.

Sources

See also

 List of steam frigates of the United States Navy
 Bibliography of American Civil War naval history
 Union Navy
 Confederate States Navy

 

Steamships of the United States Navy
1866 ships
Shipwrecks of the New York (state) coast
Maritime incidents in 1876